Events from the year 1734 in France

Incumbents
 Monarch – Louis XV

Events
29 June – Battle of San Pietro
19 September – Battle of Guastalla

Births
18 February – Jean-Marie Roland, vicomte de la Platière, manufacturer (died 1793)
9 March – Marie-Suzanne Giroust, painter (died 1772)
April – Nicolas Champenois, missionary (died 1811)
Full date missing – Gilles-Barnabé Guimard, architect (died 1805)

Deaths

9 February – Pierre Polinière, investigator of electricity and electrical phenomena (born 1671)
10 February – Jean Raoux, painter (born 1677)
1 April – Louis Lully, composer (born 1664)
21 May – Philippine Élisabeth d'Orléans, princess (born 1714)
27 May – Claude Audran III, painter (born 1658)
12 June – James FitzJames, 1st Duke of Berwick, military leader (born 1670)
5 September – Nicolas Bernier, composer (born 1664)
14 November – Louise de Kérouaille, Duchess of Portsmouth, mistress of Charles II of England (born 1649)
21 November – Alexis Simon Belle, painter (born 1674)
Full date missing
Louis de Chastillon, painter (born c.1639)
Étienne de Veniard, Sieur de Bourgmont, explorer (born 1679)

See also

References

1730s in France